Monoblock can refer to:

A type of air conditioner
A monoblock LNB
A mono (one channel) audio power amplifier
In photography, another name for a monolight, a type of electronic flash with the electronics in the head, as opposed to a pack-and-head system

See also

Monoblock Industry of Imagineering

Monobloc (disambiguation)
Block (disambiguation)
Mono (disambiguation)

ru:Моноблок